Mattila is a Finnish surname. Notable people with the surname include:

Hanna-Leena Mattila, Finnish politician
Jaakko Mattila (born 1976), Finnish painter
Jarno Mattila, Finnish footballer
Karita Mattila (born 1960), opera soprano
Olavi J. Mattila (born 1918), Finnish Trade and Industry Ministry official
Pertti Mattila (born 1948), Finnish mathematician
Pirkko Mattila (born 1964), Finnish politician
Risto Mattila (born 1981), Finnish snowboarder
Sakari Mattila (born 1989), Finnish footballer
Topi Mattila (born 1946), Finnish ski jumper
Ville Mattila (1903–1987), Finnish cross country skier

See also
Tapani Mattila memorial trophy

Patronymic surnames
Finnish-language surnames